Nunavut Arctic College (Inuinnaqtun: Nunavunmi Inirnirit Iliharviat) is a public community college in the territory of Nunavut, Canada. The college has several campuses throughout the territory and operates as a public agency (Crown corporation) funded by the territorial government.

History
The college was founded in 1995. Its origins date to 1968 when the Government of the Northwest Territories established the Adult Vocational Training Centre.

Campus

Nunavut Arctic College has three campuses (Nunatta Campus, Kitikmeot Campus, Kivalliq Campus) and 24 Community Learning Centres.
 Nunavut Arctic College's Headquarters Arviat
 Kitikmeot Campus (Kangok Road) in Cambridge Bay
 Kivalliq Campus: Sanatuliqsarvik (Nunavut Trades Training Centre), and Kivalliq Hall are in Rankin Inlet
 Nunatta Campus is in Iqaluit
 Nunavut Research Institute – Iqaluit, Arviat, Cambridge Bay, Rankin Inlet and Igloolik
 Piqqusilirivvik Inuit Cultural Learning Centre – Clyde River with satellite locations in Baker Lake and Igloolik

On campus housing is available to full-time students at all three campuses.

Partnerships
The college hosts lecturers for Akitsiraq Law School, and participates in the University of the Arctic.  Other partnerships include (Education, Nursing, Law):
 Nunavut Teacher Education Program (NTEP) with Memorial University 
 Nursing Program with Dalhousie University

See also
 Higher education in Canada
 Higher education in Nunavut
 Nunavut Arctic College Media

References

External links

 Nunavut Arctic College
 Akitsiraq Law School

Education in Nunavut
Universities and colleges in the territories of Canada
Educational institutions established in 1968
Educational institutions established in 1995
Crown corporations of Nunavut
Education in Iqaluit
Indigenous universities and colleges in North America
1968 establishments in Canada
1995 establishments in Canada